Paolo Odierna (died 1506) was a Roman Catholic prelate who served as Bishop of Gaeta (1494–1506).

Biography
On 22 October 1494, Paolo Odierna was appointed during the papacy of Pope Alexander VI as Bishop of Gaeta.
He served as Bishop of Gaeta until his death on 13 August 1506.

References

External links and additional sources
 (for Chronology of Bishops) 
 (for Chronology of Bishops) 

15th-century Italian Roman Catholic bishops
16th-century Italian Roman Catholic bishops
Bishops appointed by Pope Alexander VI
1506 deaths